Brian Babylon is an American comedian and radio host from Chicago.. Babylon is a regular panelist on NPR's Wait Wait... Don't Tell Me!, a regular host of The Moth story telling event in Chicago, has appeared on the national broadcast, and is a regular contributor to Chicago Ideas.

From 2009 to 2015, he co-hosted "The Morning AMP" radio show on Vocalo with Molly Adams and regularly appeared on WBEZ talk shows. As an actor, he appeared on Inside Amy Schumer. He was also on the production team of Why? with Hannibal Buress. He founded the Bronzeville Comedy Showcase in 2007.

Credits

References

External links

Living people
Comedians from Illinois
Radio personalities from Chicago
People from Chicago
African-American male comedians
American male comedians
21st-century American comedians
American stand-up comedians
1975 births
21st-century African-American people
20th-century African-American people